Ksour may refer to:
Ksar (plural ksour), the North African Arabic term for "castle"
Ksour Range, a mountain massif of the Saharan Atlas
Ksour, Bordj Bou Arreridj, a town and commune in Bordj Bou Arréridj Province, Algeria
Ksour Essef, a town and commune in the Mahdia Governorate, Tunisia
Ain Ksour, a village in Aley District, Lebanon
Ksour Festival, an annual festival organised in Tataouine, Tunisia